The western long-tailed brush lizard (Urosaurus graciosus) is a species of lizard in the family Phrynosomatidae. The species is native to the southwestern United States and adjacent northern Mexico.

Habitat and geographic range
U. graciosus occurs in the Mojave Desert and the northwestern Sonoran Desert in the U.S. states of California, Arizona and Nevada, and in the Mexican states of Baja California and Sonora.

Common name
This species received its common name, long-tailed brush lizard, due to its tail, which is more than twice the body length, and due to its almost always being encountered on a tree or shrub.

Behavior
The long-tailed brush lizard's gray or tan coloration keeps it well camouflaged against branches while it waits for insects. Unlike most other phrynosomatid lizards, which bury in the sand at night during warm weather, U. graciosus spends the night on the tips of branches.

Identification
U. graciosus is distinguishable from its close relative the tree lizard, Urosaurus ornatus, by the presence of a tail more than two times its snout-vent length and the absence of a series of smaller scales running down the middle of the band of enlarged dorsal scales.  U. graciosus is distinguishable from the black-tailed brush lizard, Urosaurus nigricauda, by the presence of a tail more than two times its snout-vent length and relatively large dorsal scales transitioning abruptly into granular lateral scales (in U. nigricauda, the dorsal scales are only slightly enlarged and transition gradually into the granular lateral scales). It is distinguishable from all other brush lizards (Urosaurus) by geography.

Reproduction
U. graciosus is oviparous.

Subspecies
Two subspecies are recognized as being valid, including the nominotypical subspecies.
Urosaurus graciosus graciosus 
Urosaurus graciosus shannoni

Etymology
The subspecific name, shannoni, is in honor of American herpetologist Frederick Albert Shannon.

References

External links
californiaherps.com Urosaurus graciosus page
calphotos.berkeley.edu Urosaurus graciosus page
wildherps.com Urosaurus graciosus page
Arizona PARC Urosaurus graciosus page
Cabeza Prieta Natural History Association Urosaurus graciosus page

Further reading
Boulenger, George Albert (1885). Catalogue of the Lizards in the British Museum (Natural History). Second Edition. Volume II. Iguanidæ ... London: Trustees of the British Museum (Natural History). (Taylor and Francis, printers). xiii + 497 pp. + Plates I-XXIV. (Uta gratiosa, p. 213).
Hallowell, Edward (1854). "Descriptions of new Reptiles from California". Proceedings of the Academy of Natural Sciences of Philadelphia 7: 91–97. (Urosaurus graciosus, new species, pp. 92–93).
Lowe, Charles H., Jr. (1955). "A New Subspecies of Urosaurus graciosus Hallowell with a Discussion of Relationships Within and of the genus Urosaurus ". Herpetologica 11 (2): 96–101. (Urosaurus graciosus shannoni, new subspecies).
Mittleman, M. B. (1942). "A Summary of the Iguanid Genus Urosaurus ". Bulletin of the Museum of Comparative Zoölogy at Harvard College 91 (1): 105–181 + Plates 1–16. (Urosaurus ornatus graciosus, pp. 144–145 + Plate 7).
Reeder, Tod W.; Wiens, John J. (1996). "Evolution of the Lizard Family Phrynosomatidae as Inferred from Diverse Types of Data". Herpetological Monographs 10: 43-84.
Stebbins, Robert C. (2003). A Field Guide to Western Reptiles and Amphibians, Third Edition. The Peterson Field Guide Series ®. Boston and New York:  Houghton Mifflin Company. 533 pp., 56 color plates. . (Urosaurus graciosus, pp. 295–296 + Plate 32 + Map 97).
Wiens, John J. (1993). "Phylogenetic Systematics of the Tree Lizards (Genus Urosaurus)". Herpetologica 49 (4): 399-420.

Urosaurus
Fauna of the Colorado Desert
Fauna of the Mojave Desert
Fauna of the Sonoran Desert
Reptiles of Mexico
Reptiles of the United States
Reptiles described in 1854
Taxa named by Edward Hallowell (herpetologist)